Leucanopsis biedala is a moth of the family Erebidae. It was described by William Schaus in 1941. It is found in French Guiana and Brazil.

References

 

biedala
Moths described in 1941